Walker Smith is the name of

 Walker Smith (cricketer) (1847–1900), English cricketer
 Walker Smith (hurdler) (1896–1993), American hurdler
 Sugar Ray Robinson (born Walker Smith Jr.; 1921–1989), American boxer